Rodolfo Vicente Gamarra Varela (born 10 December 1988) is a Paraguayan football winger who plays for C.D. Cobresal.

Career

Club
Gamarra played his first professional game with Libertad in the Paraguayan Primera División on 18 November 2008, on a 1–1 draw against Tacuary. On 20 May 2009 he scored his two first professional goals in the 4–1 victory over 12 de Octubre.

CSA
On 15 June 2019 CSA signed Gamarra from Guaraní.

International career
Gamarra won with the Paraguayan U-16 team the 2004 U-16 South American Championship. He played his first game for the senior national team in 2009, in an unofficial friendly against Chile. He was called by coach Gerardo Martino for the final Paraguayan squad to play at the 2010 FIFA World Cup, with only 2 official international games played to that date.

References

External links

1988 births
Living people
Paraguayan footballers
Paraguayan expatriate footballers
Club Libertad footballers
Cerro Porteño players
Club Guaraní players
Centro Sportivo Alagoano players
Cobresal footballers
Paraguayan Primera División players
Campeonato Brasileiro Série A players
Chilean Primera División players
2010 FIFA World Cup players
Sportspeople from Asunción
Paraguay international footballers
Association football wingers
Paraguayan expatriate sportspeople in Brazil
Paraguayan expatriate sportspeople in Chile
Expatriate footballers in Brazil
Expatriate footballers in Chile